St Anne's Church is an Anglican church in Brown Edge, Staffordshire, England, and in the Diocese of Lichfield. The building is Grade II listed.

History and description
In the early 19th century the inhabitants of Brown Edge were miners who worked at Chatterley Whitfield and other mines, a few miles away. The benefactors who gave land for the church, and contributed to its building, included the owners of these mines, notably the mine-owner Hugh Henshall Williamson (1785–1867).

The church, designed by J. C. Trubshaw, was built in 1844, using local stone. It was consecrated on 1 June 1844 by the Bishop of Lichfield, John Lonsdale.

The tower, with a spire, was built by Ward and Son in 1854. It is built against the north-east of the church, and is described in the listing text as "Iconoclastic Romanesque".

See also
Listed buildings in Brown Edge

References

Grade II listed churches in Staffordshire
Church of England church buildings in Staffordshire
Diocese of Lichfield